Barton Zwiebach (born Barton Zwiebach Cantor, October 4, 1954) is a Peruvian string theorist and professor at the Massachusetts Institute of Technology.

Work
Zwiebach's undergraduate work was in Electrical Engineering at the Universidad Nacional de Ingeniería in Peru, from which he graduated in 1977.

His graduate work was in physics at the California Institute of Technology. Zwiebach obtained his Ph.D. in 1983, working under the supervision of Murray Gell-Mann. He has held postdoctoral positions at the University of California, Berkeley, and at the Massachusetts Institute of Technology, where he became an assistant professor of physics in 1987, and a permanent member of the faculty in 1994.

He is one of the world's leading experts in string field theory. He wrote the textbook A First Course in String Theory (2004), meant for undergraduates.

Selected publications
Professor Zwiebach's publications are available on the SPIRES HEP Literature Database.

References

External links
 

1954 births
Living people
People from Lima
Peruvian emigrants to the United States
California Institute of Technology alumni
University of California, Berkeley staff
Peruvian physicists
Massachusetts Institute of Technology faculty
American string theorists
National University of Engineering alumni
MIT Center for Theoretical Physics faculty